Incense and Peppermints is the debut album by psychedelic rock band Strawberry Alarm Clock. Released in October 1967, it reached No. 11 on the Billboard 200 album charts during a 24 week run and included the band's No. 1 Billboard Hot 100 hit "Incense and Peppermints". In addition to the band's six official members, the album features the flute playing of Steve Bartek, who co-wrote four of the album's songs with bass player George Bunnell.

The tracks "The World's on Fire", "Rainy Day Mushroom Pillow", and "Incense and Peppermints" were all featured in the motion picture Psych-Out, along with a new song, "Pretty Song from Psych-Out", which later appeared on the band's second album, Wake Up...It's Tomorrow.

A compilation album of the same name (albeit spelled with an ampersand) was released by MCA in 1990. To date, the album has been released on CD only in Japan and (more recently) on Sundazed Records.

Track listing

Side 1
"The World's on Fire" (S.A. Clock) – 8:21
"Birds in My Tree" (George Bunnell, Steve Bartek) - 1:53
"Lose to Live" (Mark Weitz, S.A. Clock) – 3:13
"Strawberries Mean Love" (Bunnell, Bartek) – 3:01

Side 2
"Rainy Day Mushroom Pillow" (Bunnell, Bartek) – 3:05
"Paxton's Back Street Carnival" (Bunnell, Bartek) – 2:01
"Hummin' Happy" (Bunnell, Randy Seol) – 2:25
"Pass Time with the SAC" [Instrumental] (S.A. Clock) – 1:21
"Incense and Peppermints" (John S. Carter, Tim Gilbert) (uncredited: Mark Weitz, Ed King) – 2:47
"Unwind with the Clock" (Lee Freeman, Ed King) – 4:10

Japanese CD bonus track
"The Birdman of Alkatrash" (Weitz)

Personnel
Mark Weitz - organ, piano, harpsichord, vocals
Randy Seol - drums, bongos, vibraphone, vocals
Ed King - lead guitar, vocals
Lee Freeman - rhythm guitar, harmonica, vocals
George Bunnell - bass, vocals
Gary Lovetro - bass, vocals
Steve Bartek - flute
Greg Munford - lead vocals on "Incense and Peppermints" (uncredited)
Technical
Paul Buff - engineer
Ed Caraeff - photography

References 

1967 debut albums
Strawberry Alarm Clock albums
Uni Records albums